Chandrakant Sangani was Indian Gujarati language director, writer and actor from Gujarat, India, who worked predominantly with Gujarati cinema.

Biography
Sangani was born on 10 June 1927 in Saurashtra region of Gujarat, India. Sangani started his career as a radio performer, and wrote novels. He served as a journalist for the Gujarati magazine Prajatantra from 1957 to 1963. In 1968, he debuted in Gujarati cinema with his film Mare Javun Pele Paar.

In 1970, he adapted Chunilal Shah's novel Jigar Ane Ami into film by the same title. His musical drama Tanariri, based on the story of Tana and Riri, (1975) is considered to be a significant film in Gujarati cinema. In 1977, he adapted Shayda's story Vanzari Vaav into film Kariyavar.

Filmography
Mare Javun Pele Paar (1968)
Jigar Ane Ami (1970)
Tanariri (1975)
Sati Jasma Odan (1976)
Vanjari Vav (1977)
Saubhagya Sindoor (1977)
Tame Re Champo Ne Ame Kel (1978)
Garvo Garasiyo (1980)
Parayana To Pyara Ladi (1980)
Vansdi Vagi Valamni (1981)
Prem Diwani (1982)
Raakhna Ramakada (1983)
Sorathno Savaj (1985)
Gunahon Ke Shatranj (1988)
Ghar Ek Mandir (1988), TV series
Mayavi Jaal (1992), TV series
Geetanjali (1993)

References

External links
 

1927 births
Gujarati-language film directors
Film directors from Gujarat
Possibly living people